Bemokotra Sud is a rural municipality in western Madagascar. It belongs to the district of Maintirano, which is a part of Melaky Region. The population of the municipality 5773 in 2019.

Only primary schooling is available. The majority 90%  of the population of the municipality are farmers, while an additional 7% receives their livelihood from raising livestock. The most important crop is rice,  while other important products are maize, cassava and barley.  Additionally fishing employs 3% of the population.

References

Populated places in Melaky